The Jeepster Commando is an automobile which was first produced by Kaiser Jeep in 1966 to compete with the International Scout, Toyota Land Cruiser and Ford Bronco.  Four different models were available: a pickup truck, convertible, roadster and wagon.  The Jeepster remained in production after American Motors Corporation (AMC) bought the Jeep line from Kaiser in 1970.  After AMC's acquisition, the Jeepster Commando C101 (101" wheelbase) steadily grew in popularity.  In 1972, AMC shortened the vehicle's name to Commando C104, extended the wheelbase to 104", and changed the front-end design to accept the AMC I6 and V8 304ci, similar to the Ford Bronco.  The new configuration, formerly an AMC best seller, quickly caused the line to drop in popularity and was taken out of production in 1973; it was replaced with the full size Cherokee. The Jeepster is an ancestor of the modern Jeep family produced by Chrysler.

There are several Jeepster enthusiast clubs across the United States.

Willys-Overland, the original producers of the "Jeep" (originally manufactured for military use), also produced a "Jeepster" from 1948 until about 1950. This vehicle led to the later Kaiser productions.

C101
The Jeepster was revived in 1966 as a 1967 model in the form of the Jeepster Commando ("C101"). The F-head Hurricane straight-4 was used (a direct descendant of the original Go Devil engine) and four-wheel drive was finally added. The  Dauntless V6 was optional and preferred with its   of torque. A total of 57,350 Kaiser-spec "C101" Jeepster Commandos were sold between 1966 and 1971.

Body styles of the Jeepster Commando included station wagon (with full-length metal hardtop), convertible, pickup, and roadster (with optional half- or full-length softtop). The deluxe station wagon included sliding rear windows and full interior trim—and available two-tone exterior.

The 1971  Hurst Jeepster built with modifications by Hurst Performance is possibly the scarcest model of all production Jeeps. Standard equipment included a Champagne White exterior with red and blue stripes, a roof rack, a sports steering wheel, and Goodyear G70 x 15 raised white letter tires mounted on wider steel wheels. Hurst equipment included special exterior insignia, an 8,000-rpm  tachometer on the back of the hood scoop in the driver's line of sight, as well as a Hurst T-handle shifter on manual-transmission cars or a console-mounted Hurst Dual-Gate shifter with the optional automatic transmission.

The Jeepster Commando came in three types: Revival Jeepster, Commando convertible, and an open body roadster with no top at all. The Revival Jeepster, named "Jeepster", as shown in hood side emblem an VIN decode or Jeepster Convertible was the showcase vehicle of the fleet, offering deluxe interior appointments, powered convertible top, and a Continental tire kit (available only for this model). The Commando convertible offered the same body with just the basic finish and equipment.

Engines:
 1966–1971: F134 Hurricane I4—134.2 CID (2,199 cc), 75 hp (55 kW) and 114 ft·lbf (154 N·m)
 1966–1971: Dauntless 225 V6—225.3 CID (3,692 cc),  bore,  stroke, 160 hp (119 kW) and 235 ft·lbf (318 N·m)

C104

The Jeepster name was removed after 1971, but the model remained in production for two more years as the Jeep Commando. In 1972, it received a "conventional" full-width grille (see picture). A total of 20,223 AMC-spec "C104" Jeep Commandos were made in 1972 and 1973.

Engines:

 1971–1972:  AMC 232 I6— 231.91 CID (3,800.3 cc),  bore,  stroke, 100 hp (74 kW) and 185 ft·lbf (250 N·m)
 1971–1972: AMC 258 I6—258.08 CID (4,229.2 cc),  bore,  stroke
 1971–1973:  AMC–304 V8—303.92 CID (4,980.3 cc),  bore,  stroke 1971: 210 hp, 1972: 150 hp

See also
 Commando Jeep
 Willys-Overland Jeepster

References

External links

 The Jeepster Commando Club of America
 Vintage Jeeps
 American Jeepster Club

1960s cars
1970s cars
American Motors
Jeep vehicles
Kaiser Motors
Motor vehicles manufactured in the United States
Trucks of the United States
Vehicles introduced in 1966